Ceramide synthase 4 (CerS4) is an enzyme that in humans is encoded by the CERS4 gene and is one of the least studied of the ceramide synthases.

Function and distribution
CerS4 synthesizes ceramides containing C18-22 fatty acids in a fumonisin B1-independent manner. It is expressed at highest levels in skin, leukocytes, heart and liver, although at much lower levels than other ceramide synthases.

Tissue and cellular distribution 

CerS4 (TRH1) mRNA was found in all tissues and is strongly expressed in skin and muscle

Clinical significance
In a 2009 study of breast cancer, total ceramide synthase levels were increased in malignant tissue, and CerS4 was one of three ceramide synthases to show an increase in mRNA levels. A significant correlation was found between CerS4 and CerS2/CerS6 expression. Unlike CerS1 and CerS5, CerS4 does not sensitize cells to chemotherapeutic drugs.

CerS4 may also be involved in the control of body weight and food intake. Upon administration of leptin, a decrease in ceramide levels was observed in rat white adipose tissue, as were expression levels of a number of genes in the sphingolipid metabolic pathway, including CerS2 and CerS4.

CerS4 expression was also found to be elevated in the brain of an Alzheimer's disease mouse model.

References

Human proteins
Integral membrane proteins